Shortwave may refer to:

Science
Shortwave radio
Shortwave radio receiver
Shortwave listening
List of shortwave radio broadcasters
Shortwave (meteorology)
Shortwave radiation

Music
Short Wave Live, the only album by Short Wave, a Canterbury scene band